Unite America (previously known as The Centrist Project) is an American grassroots organization founded by Charlie Wheelan with the goal of reforming the political system and bridging the partisan divide. Unite America supports both electoral political reforms as well as independent-minded candidates.

Affiliated politicians include: 
Former Alaska Governor Bill Walker, former Iowa state senator David Johnson, Greg Orman, and Evan McMullin.

History 
Author and educator Charles Wheelan published The Centrist Manifesto in 2013, inspired by the failed bipartisan efforts surrounding the Simpson-Bowles Commission in 2011. In the book, he outlines an approach to government in which a "Centrist Party" challenges partisanship by controlling the swing vote and facilitating compromise between Democrats and Republicans. Putting ideas into practice, Wheelan worked with business, political, and academic leaders from across the country to form the Centrist Project in 2014, which would eventually become Unite America.

In October 2016, Nick Troiano, former congressional candidate and part of "Forbes 30 under 30" for Law & Policy, joined as executive director. The organization continued to grow through 2017, attracting talent from both sides of the aisle on a mission to elect enough independents to shift the balance of power in key state and statewide elections. Unite America adopted its current name in January 2018, aiming to reflect the organization's core mission. Unite America announced the first-ever nationwide slate of independent candidates in February 2018.

In March 2019, Unite America announced that they were expanding their mission of accelerating the democracy reform movement, with strategic investments in multi-cycle campaigns and infrastructure. They also announced the addition of two new board members: philanthropist Kathryn Murdoch and former independent Senate candidate Neal Simon.

Mission 
Unite America aims to bridge the partisan divide by passing electoral reforms that incentivize leaders to represent their constituents and support candidates who will work across the aisle. It endorses candidates on both federal and statewide levels. Unite America candidates and supporters subscribe to a set of principles laid out in the "Unity Principles."

Strategy 
Unite America works by making strategic investments to accelerate the democracy reform movement. Through the Unite America Fund, the organization invests in campaigns across four key reform areas:

 Ranked Choice Voting
  Open Primaries
  Independent Redistricting Commissions
 Vote at Home

The organization's commitment to these reforms is based in part on the Harvard Business School study by Katherine Gehl and Michael Porter.

In keeping with their mission of scaling the democracy reform movement, the organization also invests in what they call "movement capacity" to align organizations within the democracy reform space.

The third pillar of the organization is supporting what they call "Unity Candidates"; candidates who are independent-minded, committed to reform, and sign on to the organization's Unity Principles.

"Unity Principles" 
Each of Unite America's endorsed candidates abides by a unifying set of principles. Formerly called the "Declaration of Independents,"  published in February 2018, the principles are now called the Unity Principles to reflect the larger aims of the organization. Developed by Unite America's leadership, the document lays out the movement's five key tenets:

Reform strategy 
In 2019, Unite America released the first State of Democracy Report in which they graded every state based on their status in five reform areas. In September 2019, Unite America announced their plan to invest in their first portfolio of campaigns based on these reforms.

Unity Candidates

Virginia 
In March 2019, Unite America announced the creation of their new statewide chapter, Unite Virginia. Unite Virginia would work to reward bipartisanship and support candidates through the 2019 primary elections.

The organization endorsed a bipartisan slate of candidates in Virginia.

Partnerships

State-focused partnerships 
In an effort to build the movement from the ground up, Unite America endorses and provides resources to independent candidates for state legislatures in a number of viable states, including Colorado, New Mexico, Maine, Alaska, and Washington.

Unite Colorado 
Unite America formalized its Colorado-concentrated efforts for statehouse elections with the organization of its largest state-focused affiliate, Unite Colorado. Troiano identified the state's wide-ranging political leanings and the potential for a historic independent candidate victory as the driving motivations for this strategy. In 2018, Unite Colorado endorsed five independent candidates the Colorado House of Representatives and the Colorado Senate.

The group will endorse independent candidates running for office in New Mexico state legislature in an effort to promote competition amongst 30 of 70 uncontested New Mexico House of Representatives seats.

Washington Independents 

Washington Independents, with support from Unite America, launched in fall of 2017 with the intention of supporting independent, centrist candidates in Washington. Its co-founders were Chris Vance, the former chairman of the state's Republican Party, and Brian Baird, a former Democratic Congressman (WA-3). The Political Action Committee spent over $100,000 on three candidates for state office in the 2018 general election. All three lost. In spring of 2019, Washington Independents announced that it would suspend operations.

Unite Virginia 

In March 2019, Unite America launched Unite Virginia in order to focus on Virginia's off-year state legislative elections. Pivoting from its strategy in the 2018 elections, Unite America chose to support moderate, reform-minded Republicans and Democrats rather than independents. More specifically, it worked with four moderate primary challengers — two on the right and two on the left. Three of the four won their races.

The Committee for Ranked Choice Voting 

In 2018, Unite America endorsed the Committee for Ranked Choice Voting, an organization that pushed for the implementation of instant-runoff voting in Maine. After a majority of voters approved a RCV citizens ballot initiative in 2016, state lawmakers called a special session to repeal the measure. In the following year, the people of Maine petitioned to override the veto, ultimately voting to restore RCV in Maine in time for the 2018 general election.

2018 Endorsed National and State Candidates
Unite America announced the first-ever slate of national candidates in February 2018, including three gubernatorial candidates and two candidates for US Senate. 

In January 2018, Unite Colorado announced a slate of independent candidates for both the Colorado House of Representatives and the Colorado Senate. In addition, Unite America endorsed independent candidates for state office in Alaska, Arizona, Maine, Maryland, New Mexico, South Dakota, Vermont, Virginia, and Washington. All but four were defeated.

Board of directors 
Unite America's operating board is made up of leaders from both private and public spheres.

 Charles Wheelan, founder and senior economics lecturer at Dartmouth College
 Neal Simon, former candidate for US Senate
 Kathryn Murdoch, co-founder and president of Quadrivium
 Shawn Riegsecker, CEO and founder of Centro Inc
 Lisa D. T. Rice, political and external affairs strategist
 Marc Merrill, co-chairman, co-CEO, and co-founder of Riot Games
 Ben Goldhirsh, co-founder and chairman of GOOD
 Katherine Gehl, former president and CEO of Gehl Foods

References 

Political organizations based in the United States
Centrist political advocacy groups in the United States